Ross Watson (born May 22, 1975) is a designer of computer, miniature and role-playing games and a writer in various genres. Watson worked on the Warhammer 40,000 Roleplay line as the Lead Developer for Dark Heresy, was the lead designer for Rogue Trader and Deathwatch, and was part of the design team for Black Crusade. He was the lead developer for both Aaron Allston's Strike Force and Savage Worlds Rifts. His written works include the Accursed and Weird War I settings for Savage Worlds, contributions to the Star Wars: Edge of the Empire RPG, and the video games Darksiders II, Warhammer 40,000: Regicide, and Battlefleet Gothic: Armada. Watson has designed rules and scenarios for miniature game lines, such as Dust Warfare, and he has written for several card games, including Warhammer: Invasion, Empire Engine, and the Lost Legacy series.

Personal life
Watson was born in Fayetteville, Arkansas. He has been a lifelong gamer, starting at age 11. His first year of employment was as a landscaper/lawn mower in Hot Springs, Arksansas.

Beginnings in role-playing games
Watson was introduced to role-playing games by his father in Evanston, Wyoming during 1986. He started out playing Dungeons & Dragons, and by the time he was in high school, he was playing several different systems at the same time: Robotech, TMNT, Rifts, Star Wars, and Marvel Super Heroes. Watson was often asked to come up with the stories and adventures for these games during lunch, building his ability to improvise and connect narratives.
Watson said, "My father brought home this red box labeled ‘Dungeons and Dragons.’ He told me that ‘it looked interesting,’ and that I should ‘really learn how to play it.’ So I did."

Watson first became interested in wargaming during high school. During his enlistment in the US Army at Fort Knox, Kentucky, Watson became involved with a local group playing Warhammer 40,000. Since 1999, he has been a miniature war-gaming enthusiast.

Career

D20
Watson's involvement in the Louisville, Kentucky gaming scene led to his employment as the D20 Line Editor at Citizen Games. He helped develop and write several products for Citizen Games and parlayed that success into freelance writing for other companies such as Atlas Games and Fantasy Flight Games.
Watson wrote for several D20 projects, including the Penumbra Fantasy Bestiary, Sorcery & Steam, and the award-winning Dawnforge: Crucible of Legend. Wizards of the Coast tapped Watson to edit the Complete Divine sourcebook for Dungeons & Dragons 3.5.

Games Workshop
In late 2003, Watson was employed as a copywriter/editor at Games Workshop in Glen Burnie, Maryland. He joined the US White Dwarf team creating content for the magazine for Warhammer 40,000, Warhammer Fantasy, and The Lord of the Rings Fantasy Battle Game.

Fantasy Flight Games
Watson was hired in 2008 by Fantasy Flight Games after that company acquired the license for Warhammer 40,000 Roleplay. He joined the company as the Lead Developer for Dark Heresy, became the principal architect of Rogue Trader and Deathwatch, and helped design Black Crusade. Watson worked on over 50 products across the Warhammer 40,000 Roleplay lines. While at Fantasy Flight Games, Watson consulted on several Warhammer 40,000-themed games made at the company, such as Relic, Space Hulk: Death Angel, and Horus Heresy. He developed the Dust Warfare miniatures game and contributed to the design of Star Wars: Edge of the Empire.

Accursed
In 2013, Watson teamed up with John Dunn and Jason Marker to produce Accursed, a campaign setting of Watson's own design for Savage Worlds. Accursed was successfully kickstarted, and several titles for the line have been produced. Accursed is a campaign setting that "combines Hellboy with Solomon Kane," where the players take on the roles of classic monsters fighting against evil witches who have conquered their land.

Evil Beagle Games
Watson joined Evil Beagle Games as a partner with the company's founder, Sean Patrick Fannon, in 2014. Watson became the company's managing director and has overseen the production of books for Shaintar, a high-fantasy setting for the Savage Worlds RPG. In 2015, it was announced that Evil Beagle Games, with Watson as lead developer, would be working with Palladium Books and Pinnacle Entertainment Group to produce Savage Rifts, an adaptation of the Rifts setting to Savage Worlds. Evil Beagle also collaborated with High Rock publishing, again with Watson as lead developer, to create a new edition of Aaron Allston's Strike Force in 2016.

Ulisses Spiele 
Watson joined Ulisses Spiele in early 2017 to develop a new Warhammer 40,000 Roleplaying Game. This RPG line eventually became Wrath &amp; Glory, utilizing a game system designed by Watson. Wrath &amp; Glory initially launched with Ulisses Spiele but would eventually become transferred to Cubicle 7 in 2019. Afterwards, Watson went to work designing an RPG named Myth: Tales of Legend, based on the board game Myth by Megacon Games.

Freelance Work
Watson has worked as a freelance writer, game designer, and IP consultant since 2001. He consulted with Catalyst Game Labs on Shadowrun 5th edition and has designed several game products for Pinnacle Entertainment Group, including Lankhmar: City of Thieves and the Last Parsec. Watson contributed to the No Quarter Presents: Urban Adventure project for Privateer Press and In Defense of Innocence for Wyrd Games.

Podcast and Blog
The Rogue Warden is Watson's personal blog about gaming that he started in 2012. It was nominated for an ENNie award in 2013, and has since been combined with his personal web page. Watson hosted the Gamer's Tavern podcast, a show discussing gaming and game design. In mid-2016, he stepped down from hosting the podcast.

Video Games
Watson worked as a narrative designer on Dark Millennium Online, Regicide, and Darksiders II. For Regicide, he wrote the main story, cutscenes, and in-game dialogue. On Darksiders II, Watson worked on portions of the main game's script and wrote the stories and dialogue for all three DLCs.  He wrote the dialogue, story, and promotional trailers for Battlefleet Gothic: Armada.

Bibliography

Fiction
 Accursed
Pirate's Oath (2016)
 Deadzone
Containment Protocols (2014)

Role-playing books
 Dark Heresy
 Disciples of the Dark Gods, 
 Creatures Anathema, 
 Ascension, 
 The Radical’s Handbook, 
 Blood of Martyrs, 
 The Haalock’s Legacy Trilogy, 
 Daemon Hunter, 
 The Church of the Damned, 
 The Black Sepulchre, 
 The Book of Judgement, 
 The Lathe Worlds, 
 Salvation Demands Sacrifice
 Heed the Higher Call
 Heresy Begets Retribution
 Edge of Darkness
 Knowledge is Power
 Rogue Trader
 Rogue Trader Core Rulebook, 
 Lure of the Expanse, 
 Edge of the Abyss, 
 Into the Storm, 
 Hostile Acquisitions, 
 The Warpstorm Trilogy Part II: Citadel of Skulls, 
 The Warpstorm Trilogy Part III: Fallen Suns, 
 Battlefleet Koronus, 
 The Navis Primer, 
 Forsaken Bounty
 Dark Frontier
 Secrets of the Expanse
 Epoch Koronus
 Drydock
 Deathwatch
 Deathwatch Core Rulebook, 
 The Emperor Protects, 
 Rites of Battle, 
 Mark of the Xenos, 
 The Achilus Assault, 
 First Founding, 
 The Jericho Reach, 
 Rising Tempest, 
 The Nemesis Incident
 Litany of War
 Final Sanction
 Oblivion’s Edge
 Know No Fear
 Black Crusade
 Black Crusade Core Rulebook, 
 The Tome of Fate, 
 Only War
 Enemies of the Imperium, 
 Hammer of the Emperor, 
 Shield of Humanity
 Savage Worlds
 Accursed, 
 Accursed: Ill Omens, 
 Accursed: Sand and Stone
 Accursed: The Banshee of Loch Finnere
 Accursed: The Guns of Dagerov
 Accursed: Fall of the Tower
 Accursed: World of Morden
 Accursed: Hatred’s Snare
 Accursed: Distant Dream
 Accursed: Pirate’s Oath: An Accursed Novella
 Accursed: Season of the Witch
 Accursed: Jumpstart
 Darkest Tides
 Freedom Squadron: Secret in the Ice
 Lankhmar: City of Thieves
 Lankhmar: Savage Foes of Nehwon
 The Last Parsec: Primer
 Primeval Thule (Savage Worlds Edition)
 Rifts: Collector’s Box Set
 Rifts: The Tomorrow Legion Player’s Guide
 Rifts: Game Master’s Guide
 Rifts: The Garnet Town Gambit
 Rifts: Savage Foes of North America
 Rifts: Tome of Destiny
 Rifts: Murderthon
 Rifts: Blood Menagerie
 Rifts: Return to Sender
 Rifts: Negotiation by Fire
 Rifts: Rift Invasion
 Rifts: Rite of Passage
 Savage Lairs: Fantasy Forests ISBN 9780991343645
 Savage Tales of Horror: Volume 3
 Weird War I: War Master’s Handbook 
 Through the Breach (1st and 2nd Editions)
 Penny Dreadful: In Defense of Innocence
TORG: Eternity
TORG: Eternity – Core Rules ISBN 9783957526830
TORG: Eternity - The Living Land Sourcebook
Delphi Missions: Rising Storm
Ruins of the Living Land
Free RPG Day Special
Warhammer Fantasy Roleplay (3rd Edition)
Black Fire Pass ISBN 9781589948150
Black Fire Pass: A Guide to Adventures on the Fringe of the Empire
Book of Grudges: A Guide to Dwarfs &amp; the Everlasting Realm
Wrath &amp; Glory (Ulisses Spiele and Cubicle 7 Editions)
Revelations
Blessings Unheralded
Dark Tides
Wrath &amp; Glory Core Rules
Starter Set

Other Role-playing Games
 1000 Faces: Villains &amp; Scoundrels ISBN 9781929474332
 Aaron Allston's Strike Force
 Complete Divine, 
 Dawnforge: Crucible of Legend, 
 D&D 5e: Feast of Tigers
 Kids on Bikes: Deluxe Edition
 Myth: Tales of Legend: The Lost Barrow
 No Quarter Presents: Urban Adventure, 
 The Penumbra Fantasy Bestiary, 
 Sorcery & Steam
 Star Wars: Edge of the Empire,

Miniatures Games
 Dust Warfare,

Card Games
 Empire Engine
 Game of Crowns
 Lost Legacy
 Mystic Vale
 Warhammer: Invasion

References

American male writers
Living people
Role-playing game designers
1975 births
21st-century American writers